Philip Thomas Bean (born 24 September 1936) is Emeritus professor of Criminology at Loughborough University, former President of the British Society of Criminology (1996–99) and an authority and author on the impact on society of drugs, mental illness and crime having published 62 works that are held in approximately 6,000 libraries around the world.

Early years 
Bean was born on 24 September 1936, the son of Thomas and Amy Bean. He was educated at Bedford Modern School, the University of London (BSc (Soc), MSc (Econ)) and the University of Nottingham (PhD).

Career 

Bean was a Lecturer and Senior Lecturer in Social Sciences at the University of Nottingham (1972–90) and later professor of Criminology at the University of Loughborough (1990–2003) before retiring Emeritus. In addition to his main roles at Nottingham and Loughborough Universities, Bean has been a Visiting Professor at American, Canadian and Australian universities and between 1996 and 1999 was President of the British Society of Criminology.

In addition to his university posts, Bean has conducted research for the United Nations, the European Commission and, in the United Kingdom, Mencap and the Home Office. Between 2000 and 2005, Bean was an Associate of the General Medical Council dealing with doctors whose conduct had been questioned. He has also advised the Metropolitan Police and the Police Department of Oman.

Selected bibliography 

 Legalising Drugs: Debates and dilemmas.  Published by the Policy Press, University of Bristol, 2010
 Drug treatment : what works?.  Published London ; New York : Routledge, 2004
 Drugs and Crime. Published Devon, UK ; Portland, Or. : Willan, 2002
 Mental Disorder and Community Safety. Published by Palgrave Macmillan, 2001
 Lost children of the Empire. Published London : Unwin Hyman, 1989
 Mental disorder and legal control.  Published Cambridge ; New York : Cambridge University Press, 1986
 In defence of welfare.  Published London ; New York : Tavistock Publications, 1985
 Adoption : essays in social policy, law, and sociology.  Published London ; New York : Tavistock, 1984
 Mental illness: changes and trends. Published Chichester [Sussex] ; New York : Wiley, 1983
 Punishment, a philosophical and criminological enquiry.  Published Oxford : M. Robertson, 1981
 Rehabilitation and Deviance.  Published London ; Boston : Routledge & K. Paul, 1976
 The social control of drugs.  Published New York, Wiley, 1974

References

External links 
 Philip Bean at WorldCat Identities

1936 births
Living people
British criminologists
Academics of Loughborough University
Alumni of the University of London
Alumni of the University of Nottingham
People educated at Bedford Modern School